Hawkins Wesley Carter (1842–1927) was a farmer and state legislator in North Carolina. He lived in Warrenton, North Carolina and was African American.

Biography  

Carter was born 1842 to Plummer Carter & Amy Hawkins.
Having relatively prosperous parents he was educated at home with privately hired teachers. 

He served in the confederate army in the American Civil War in the 46th regiment of C Company.

Carter was elected to serve three terms in the North Carolina House of Representatives from 1874 to 1880 including as a member of the House Finance Committee. He was then elected to serve in the North Carolina Senate for two terms from 1881 to 1883 representing Warren County. While in the senate he served on Agriculture, Mechanics and Mining Committee and the Deaf, Dumb and Blind Asylum Committee.

In 1882 Carter was a delegate to the Republican Congressional Convention in Warren County.

His daughter Pattie Hawkins Carter served as superintendent of the Lincoln Hospital School of Nursing and died in 1950.

An application for a soldiers pension in 1927 describes his war duties as constructing breast works, cooking and fighting along-side white soldiers.
He stated that he was 87 and can no longer work, however in 1883 he was listed as being aged 40 in the senate records.  
He had sold his farmland in Warren County and retired at the point.  

His will is on record and shows him dying in 1927 and that he had been married to Nannie Boyd (1853-1928) and they had a son Hawkins W. Carter Jr.

See also
 African-American officeholders during and following the Reconstruction era

References

Members of the North Carolina House of Representatives
North Carolina state senators
African Americans in the American Civil War
People from Warrenton, North Carolina

1842 births
1927 deaths